Lukovytsia may refer to one of several places in Ukraine:

Lukovytsia, Kaniv Raion
Lukovytsia, Chernivtsi Raion, Chernivtsi Oblast
Lukovytsia, a village in Hodynivka, Chernivtsi Raion, Chernivtsi Oblast